The 1968 Cleveland Browns season was the team's 19th season with the National Football League.
The Browns made it to the playoffs for the 2nd straight year thanks to an 8-game winning streak and the brilliant play of quarterback Bill Nelsen who replaced Frank Ryan as the starting quarterback prior to week 4 of their season.

Veteran wide receiver Paul Warfield had the best season of his entire career catching 50 passes for 1,067 yards and scoring 12 touchdowns.

Season summary 
In a relative sense Browns had not done much since 1965, when they lost to the Green Bay Packers 23–12 in the NFL Championship Game. They finished 9–5 in 1966 and '67, but made the playoffs only in the second year. However, it was a short stay, as the Dallas Cowboys blew them out 52–14 in the Eastern Conference Championship Game. So with a retooled roster the Browns headed into the 1968 season, hoping to get back into serious title contention. It worked. After a slow start in which they lost two of their first three games and three of their first five, the re-tooled Browns won eight in a row before falling 27–16 to the St. Louis Cardinals in a meaningless game in the regular-season finale. The result was a 10–4 mark, the Century Division crown (by the slimmest of margins over the 9–4–1 Cardinals) and a spot in the conference title game again opposite those same Cowboys.

Only this time, the Browns advanced, beating Dallas 31–20 to get to the league title game against the Baltimore Colts. The Colts, returning to Cleveland Stadium, where they were stunned by the Browns 27–0 in the championship contest four years before, got revenge with a shutout victory of their own, 34–0.

So it was the Colts and not the Browns who headed to Super Bowl III, where they were stunned once more, this time by the New York Jets, 16–7.

The key to the Browns' turnaround in 1968 was the insertion of Bill Nelsen at quarterback early in the season. Nelsen replaced Frank Ryan, the architect of that victory over the Colts in 1964. By '68, though, he was really banged up, battling shoulder problems. Nelsen had been acquired in an offseason trade with the Pittsburgh Steelers and was inspired by going to a team that had a chance to win. At the time, the Steelers were in the midst of a 6-year run without a playoff appearance.

Nelsen made an impact right away, helping to beat the Colts 30–20 to hand Baltimore its only loss in a 13–1 season.

Offseason

NFL draft 
The following were selected in the 1968 NFL Draft.

Personnel

Roster

Staff/Coaches

Exhibition schedule 

There was a doubleheader on September 7, 1968 Lions vs Jets (AFL) and Packers vs Browns.

Regular season schedule

Game summaries

Week 7: vs. Atlanta

Playoffs

Standings

Awards and honors 
 LeRoy Kelly, Bert Bell Award

References

External links 
 1968 Cleveland Browns at Pro Football Reference
 1968 Cleveland Browns Statistics at jt-sw.com
 1968 Cleveland Browns Schedule at jt-sw.com
 1968 Cleveland Browns at DatabaseFootball.com  
 Season summary and stats at Cleveland Browns.com

Cleveland
Cleveland Browns seasons
Cleveland Browns